Built in 1914, the Old St. Anastasia Catholic School is a historic school in Fort Pierce, Florida. It is located at 910 Orange Avenue. It was built by James P. McNichol, a senator from Philadelphia who fished in Fort Pierce during the winter, for the pastor that rode into town once a month. Along with the masonry school, McNichol had built a wooden church, rectory, and convent. Eventually the Catholic Mission would end in 1911 and the school was all that remained. On August 10, 2000, it was added to the U.S. National Register of Historic Places. After damage from Hurricane Frances and Jeanne, the structure was in a state of disrepair. The building has since been stabilized and awaits restoration.

References

External links
 St. Lucie County listings at National Register of Historic Places

Fort Pierce, Florida
Schools in St. Lucie County, Florida
Roman Catholic Diocese of Palm Beach
National Register of Historic Places in St. Lucie County, Florida
Churches on the National Register of Historic Places in Florida
School buildings on the National Register of Historic Places in Florida
1914 establishments in Florida
Educational institutions established in 1914